Live Metal Espancation is a live album by fictional heavy metal band Massacration. Their first release under the Massacration name since the 2009 studio album Good Blood Headbanguers, it was recorded during a gig at entertainment space Tropical Butantã in São Paulo on August 26, 2017 and released through Top Link Music on December 15 in CD format and for streaming, and in DVD through Shinigami Records a week later, on December 22. Under the pseudonym "El Perro Loco", Ricardo Confessori of Angra and Shaman served as a guest drummer. The cover art was provided by critically acclaimed graphic designer João Duarte.

The album was positively reviewed upon its release, with their "return to shape" after a four-year hiatus and sense of humor being praised, and was chosen by magazine Roadie Crew the best metal DVD of 2017.

Track listing

Personnel
Massacration
 Detonator (Bruno Sutter) – vocals
 Metal Avenger (Marco Antônio Alves) – lead guitar
 Red Head Hammett (Franco Fanti) – rhythm guitar, additional vocals

Guest musicians
 El Perro Loco (Ricardo Confessori) – drums
 El Mudo (Marco Klein) – bass guitar

Production
 Alexandre Russo – production
 João Duarte – cover art
 Yasmin Cruz, Julio Szoke – photography

Notes
 A. From "espancamento" (Portuguese for "spanking")

References

2017 live albums
2017 video albums
Live video albums
Massacration albums